Semi-Detached is a play written by David Turner. It premiered at the Belgrade Theatre, Coventry in June 1962 with Leonard Rossiter in the lead role, the production was directed by Tony Richardson. In 1964, the BBC recorded a radio adaptation starring Rossiter, rebroadcast in 2016 in its series Repertory in Britain.
The Belgrade Theatre  production transferred to London, still directed by Richardson, but with Laurence Olivier (replacing Rossiter), Eileen Atkins, John Thaw, James Bolam (replacing Ian McKellen) and Mona Washbourne. The play reached Broadway in New York for a season in 1963 and a film version All the Way Up (1970), directed by James MacTaggart, starred Warren Mitchell. The play was revived at the Chichester Festival in 1999.

Plot
Set in the Midlands, Fred Midway is working his way up the social ladder. His desire to be accepted in the social circles to which he aspires occupies much of his energy. At first, Fred's carefully laid plans to boost his standing in the local community backfire, before coming right in the end.

Original cast
Arnold Makepiece - Brendan Barry
Avril Hadfield - Bridget Turner
Eileen Midway - Fiona Duncan
Fred Midway - Leonard Rossiter
Garnet Hadfield - Sheila Keith
Hilda Midway - Gillian Raine
Nigel Hadfield - Michael Rothwell
Robert Freeman - William Holmes
Tom Midway - Ian McKellen

References

External links
 

1962 plays
British plays